The Granvelle Palace was a 16th-century Renaissance palace in Brussels, Belgium. It was originally built for Cardinal Archbishop Antoine Perrenot de Granvelle and was located in the former Putterie/Putterij district, between the / and the /, near today's Brussels Central Station.

The deeply redesigned Granvelle Palace served as the main seat of the Free University of Brussels between 1842 and 1928. It was demolished in 1931 to make way for the North–South connection, a major railway link through central Brussels. The  was built on its site.

History

The Palace of Granvelle
The Granvelle Palace was built around 1550 as the sumptuous residence of Cardinal Archbishop Antoine Perrenot de Granvelle. Granvelle acquired two existing hôtels particuliers there in 1549–50 and had them merged into the most beautiful manifestation of High Renaissance in the Southern Netherlands. Other candidates are Francesco Paciotti and Francesco de' Marchi, military engineers employed by Pope Paul III, with whom Granvelle maintained close contacts.

The Granvelle Palace was directly inspired by the courtyard facades of the Palazzo Farnese, designed by Michelangelo and Vignola. During the trip to Rome that Van Noyen undertook, those facades were under construction, so he may have visited the building site. It is also possible that several architects were involved in the Granvelle Palace with its different wings.

The main entrance was located on the /. Four wings were arranged around a square courtyard and a staircase tower topped with a cupola. A large gallery with open arcades departed from it, parallel to the curve of the /. Between the street and gallery was a steeply sloping garden, with citrus and fig trees, aromatic herbs and four large fountains. On the side of the Cantersteen, there was a second courtyard with further buildings and a showpiece facade. In his palace, Granvelle amassed an impressive collection of sculptures, including an antique Venus and Cupid.

In 1564, the unpopular Granvelle was forced to leave the Netherlands. As the right-hand man of King Philip II of Spain, he had earned his way with the high nobility, and also with the regent Margaret of Parma. On 13 March, his brother Thomas picked him up at his palace, whereupon unknown pranksters then nailed a "rush sale" sign. He would never see his Brussels residence again. His provost kept him regularly informed of the situation and was able to report, among other things, that the Duke of Alva, out of discretion, had refrained from taking up residence in the palace (Alva stayed in the no less luxurious Palace of William of Orange, his arch enemy).

Later history

After the fire in the Coudenberg Palace (1731) and the move of the court to the Palace of Orange-Nassau, the building served as accommodation for the Secret Council and subsequently for the Council of Finance. This entailed some transformations. During this period, it became popularly known as the Hôtel des sous ("Pennies House").

In 1842, the Free University of Brussels moved into the palace (first in part of it and from 1850 in its entirety), which it occupied until 1928. It also housed the premises of the Middle School A, today Athénée Robert Catteau, until 1893.

In 1928, the Free University had to make way for the North–South connection after 75 years. Although located some distance from the actual railway tunnel, the Granvelle Palace was demolished. The municipality of Woluwe-Saint-Pierre acquired its facades with the aim of reusing them in the construction of its new Municipal Hall, which ultimately did not happen. Unsculpted blue stones were used as sidewalk curbs in 1944, part of the white stones was used for the construction of a colonnade in Woluwe-Saint-Pierre Cemetery, and the rest was gradually sold to various private individuals.

See also

 History of Brussels
 Belgium in "the long nineteenth century"

References

Notes

Bibliography
 

Palaces in Brussels
City of Brussels
16th century in Brussels